Endymion was a 20-gun brig of the French Navy, designed by Barallier.

Career 
Commissioned under Captain Crespel, she sailed in the Caribbean and off Brazil. She took part in the Didon took part in the Invasion of Algiers in 1830 under Lieutenant Nonay, landing troops at the attack on fort Mers-el-Kebir, and in the Battle of the Tagus the next year. On the Tagus, she ferried the last diplomatic demarches before the French assault on Lisbon.

Notes and references

References

Bibliography

Age of Sail corvettes of France
Ships built in France
1824 ships